Higher-order modulation is a type of digital modulation usually with an order of 4 or higher. Examples: quadrature phase-shift keying (QPSK), and m-ary quadrature amplitude modulation (m-QAM).

See also
 phase-shift keying
 modulation order

Quantized radio modulation modes